Big Mike is a nickname of:

People with the nickname
 Stormzy (born 1994), British grime artist and rapper
 Mike Abrams (died 1898), American underworld criminal
 Michael Clemente (1908-1987), American mobster
 Michael Clarke Duncan (1957-2012), American actor sometimes credited as "Big Mike" Duncan
 Michael Elgin (born 1986), Canadian professional wrestler
 Mike Holmes, Canadian contractor-builder and TV personality
 Michael Hossack (1946–2012), American drummer for the band The Doobie Brothers
 Michael Lynche (born 1983), American singer and American Idol contestant
 Mike Mahoney (first baseman) (1873-1940), American baseball player
 Michele Miranda (1896-1973), American mobster
 Michael Oher (born 1986), American National Football League player
 Michael Sarno (born 1958), American mobster
 Black Mike Winage (1870-1977), Serbian-Canadian miner, pioneer and adventurer, known early on as "Big Mike"

Fictional characters
 Big Mike (Chuck), in the American television series Chuck

Lists of people by nickname